Sir Gaylord (February 12, 1959 – May 10, 1981) was an American Thoroughbred racehorse who later became a successful sire.

Background

He was bred and raced by Christopher Chenery. Sir Gaylord was sired by the British-bred, American-raced Turn-To out of the mare Somethingroyal and was therefore the half-brother of Secretariat.

Racing career
One of the leading two-year-old colts of 1961, Sir Gaylord was the favorite going into the 1962 Kentucky Derby. Shortly before the Derby, on May 4, he suffered a hairline fracture of the sesamoid bone in his right foreleg during a workout which ended his racing career.

Stud career
Sir Gaylord was successful as a sire. He stood at stud in the United States until 1972, when he was sent to Haras du Quesnay (France). His best-known progeny included:

 Sir Ivor (1965) - 1968 Epsom Derby winner and champion broodmare sire.  Sir Ivor was the sire of Sir Tristram a champion sire in Australia and New Zealand, as was his son Zabeel. 
 Habitat (1966), a top-level stakes winner in England and France and also a successful sire.

Death
Sir Gaylord died in France of kidney failure on May 10, 1981 aged 22.

Pedigree

References

1959 racehorse births
1981 racehorse deaths
Racehorses bred in Virginia
Racehorses trained in the United States
Thoroughbred family 2-s
Chefs-de-Race